"So Hot" refers to a Wonder Girls song.

It may also refer to:

 So Hot, 1982 album by Swamp Children
 "So Hot", song by Kovas from Prom Night (2008 film)
 So Hot Productions Christian music company
 So Hott Kid Rock song